The Marche regional election of 1985 took place on 12 May 1985.

Events
Christian Democracy was the largest party, narrowly ahead of the Italian Communist Party. After the election Emidio Massi, the incumbent Christian Democratic President, formed a new government including also the Italian Socialist Party, the Italian Democratic Socialist Party and the Italian Republican Party (organic Centre-left).

Results

Source: Ministry of the Interior

References

Elections in Marche
1985 elections in Italy